Cyornis is a genus of birds in the Old World flycatcher family Muscicapidae most of which are native to Southeast Asia.

Species
The genus contains the following 32 species:
 Hainan blue flycatcher (Cyornis hainanus)
 Pale blue flycatcher (Cyornis unicolor)
 Rück's blue flycatcher (Cyornis ruckii)
 Blue-breasted blue flycatcher (Cyornis herioti)
 Rufous-breasted blue flycatcher (Cyornis camarinensis) – split from C. herioti
 White-bellied blue flycatcher (Cyornis pallidipes)
 Pale-chinned blue flycatcher (Cyornis poliogenys)
 Hill blue flycatcher (Cyornis whitei)
 Javan blue flycatcher (Cyornis banyumas)
Dayak blue flycatcher (Cyornis montanus) Sometimes considered a subspecies of Cyornis banyumas
 Meratus blue flycatcher (Cyornis kadayangensis) – described in 2021
 Large blue flycatcher (Cyornis magnirostris)
 Palawan blue flycatcher (Cyornis lemprieri)
 Tickell's blue flycatcher (Cyornis tickelliae)
 Indochinese blue flycatcher (Cyornis sumatrensis)
 Sunda blue flycatcher (Cyornis caerulatus)
 Bornean blue flycatcher (Cyornis superbus)
 Blue-throated blue flycatcher (Cyornis rubeculoides)
 Chinese blue flycatcher (Cyornis glaucicomans) Sometimes considered as a subspecies of Cyornis rubeculoides
 Malaysian blue flycatcher (Cyornis turcosus)
 Mangrove blue flycatcher (Cyornis rufigastra)
 Kalao blue flycatcher (Cyornis kalaoensis) – split from C. rufigastra
 Sulawesi blue flycatcher (Cyornis omissus) – includes Tanahjampea blue flycatcher as a subspecies
 White-tailed flycatcher (Cyornis concretus)
 Brown-chested jungle flycatcher (Cyornis brunneatus)
 Nicobar jungle flycatcher (Cyornis nicobaricus)
 Fulvous-chested jungle flycatcher (Cyornis olivaceus)
 Grey-chested jungle flycatcher (Cyornis umbratilis)
 Crocker jungle flycatcher (Cyornis ruficrissa) Sometimes considered a subspecies of Cyornis ruficauda
 Philippine jungle flycatcher (Cyornis ruficauda)
 Sulu jungle flycatcher (Cyornis ocularis) Sometimes considered a subspecies of Cyornis ruficauda
 Sula jungle flycatcher (Cyornis colonus)
 Banggai jungle flycatcher (Cyornis pelingensis)

Seven of the above species, all with "jungle flycatcher" in their English names, were previously placed in the genus Rhinomyias but were moved to Cyornis based on the results of a 2010 molecular phylogenetic study. There are also "jungle flycatchers" in the genus Vauriella.

References

Further reading

 Del Hoyo, J.; Elliot, A. & Christie D. (editors). (2006). Handbook of the Birds of the World. Volume 11: Old World Flycatchers to Old World Warblers. Lynx Edicions. .
 

 
Taxonomy articles created by Polbot
 
Taxa named by Edward Blyth